According to the Bible, the Tribe of Levi is one of the tribes of Israel, traditionally descended from Levi, son of Jacob. The descendants of Aaron, who was the first kohen gadol (high priest) of Israel, were designated as the priestly class, the Kohanim.

The Tribe of Levi served particular religious duties for the Israelites and had political responsibilities as well. In return, the landed tribes were expected to give tithes to the Kohanim, the priests working in the Temple in Jerusalem, particularly the tithe known as the Maaser Rishon. The Levites who were not Kohanim played music in the Temple or served as guards. When Joshua led the Israelites into the land of Canaan the Levites were the only Israelite tribe that received cities but were not allowed to be landowners, because "the Lord God of Israel is their inheritance, as he said to them" (Book of Joshua). Some Biblical traditions point to the alien aspects of the Levites and their role as military troops. In this context the etymology linking the term Levi with the Mycenaean Greek term la-wo (the people / armed people) was proposed.

Notable descendants of the Levite lineage according to the Bible include Moses, Aaron, Miriam, Samuel, Jeremiah, Ezekiel, Ezra, and Malachi.

In the Bible

In the Torah
According to the Torah, the tribe is named after Levi, one of the twelve sons of Jacob (also called Israel). Levi had three sons: Gershon, Kohath, and Merari. Levi also had a daughter named Jochebed.

Kohath's son Amram was the father of Miriam, Aaron and Moses. The descendants of Aaron, the Kohanim, had the special role as priests in the Tabernacle in the wilderness and also in the Temple in Jerusalem. The remaining Levites were divided into three groups: Gershonites (descended from Gershon), Kohathites (from Kohath), and Merarites (from Merari). Each division filled different roles in the Tabernacle and later in the Temple services.

Levites' principal roles in the Temple included singing Psalms during Temple services, performing construction and maintenance for the Temple, serving as guards, and performing other services. Levites also served as teachers and judges, maintaining cities of refuge in biblical times. The Book of Ezra reports that the Levites were responsible for the construction of the Second Temple and also translated and explained the Torah when it was publicly read.

During the Exodus the Levite tribe were particularly zealous in protecting the Mosaic law in the face of those worshipping the golden calf, which may have been a reason for their priestly status. Although the Levites were not counted in the census among the children of Israel, they were numbered separately as a special army.

In the Book of Numbers the Levites were charged with ministering to the Kohanim and keeping watch over the Tabernacle:
2 And with you bring your brother also, the tribe of Levi, the tribe of your father, that they may join you and minister to you while you and your sons with you are before the tent of the testimony.3 They shall keep guard over you and over the whole tent, but shall not come near to the vessels of the sanctuary or to the altar lest they, and you, die.4 They shall join you and keep guard over the tent of meeting for all the service of the tent, and no outsider shall come near you.5 And you shall keep guard over the sanctuary and over the altar, that there may never again be wrath on the people of Israel.6 And behold, I have taken your brothers the Levites from among the people of Israel. They are a gift to you, given to the Lord, to do the service of the tent of meeting.
Numbers 18:2–6 (ESV)

In the Prophets
The Book of Jeremiah speaks of a covenant with the Kohanim and Levites, connecting it with the covenant with the seed of King David:
As the host of heaven cannot be numbered, neither the sand of the sea measured; so will I multiply the seed of David My servant, and the Levites that minister unto Me.
And the word of the  came to Jeremiah, saying:
'Considerest thou not what this people have spoken, saying: The two families which the  did choose, He hath cast them off?
Jeremiah 33:22–24, Jewish Publication Society translation, 1917

The Book of Malachi also spoke of a covenant with Levi:
My covenant was with him of life and peace, and I gave them to him, and of fear, and he feared Me, and was afraid of My name.
The law of truth was in his mouth, and unrighteousness was not found in his lips; he walked with Me in peace and uprightness, and did turn many away from iniquity.
Malachi 2:4–6, Jewish Publication Society translation, 1917

Malachi connected a purification of the "sons of Levi" with the coming of God's messenger:
But who may abide the day of his coming? And who shall stand when he appeareth? For he is like a refiner's fire, and like fullers' soap;
And he shall sit as a refiner and purifier of silver; and he shall purify the sons of Levi, and purge them as gold and silver; and there shall be they that shall offer unto the  offerings in righteousness. 
Malachi 3:1–3, Jewish Publication Society translation, 1917

Criticism
Critical scholars who follow the documentary hypothesis propose that those parts of the Torah attributed to the Elohist seem to treat Levite as a descriptive attribute for someone particularly suited to the priesthood, rather than as a firm designation of a tribe, and believe that Moses and Aaron are being portrayed as part of the Joseph group rather than being part of a tribe called Levi. Jahwist passages have more ambiguous language; traditionally interpreted as referring to a person named Levi, they could also be interpreted as just referring to a social position titled levi.

In the Blessing of Jacob, Levi is treated as a tribe, cursing them to become scattered; critics regard this as an aetiological postdiction to explain how a tribe could be so scattered, the simpler solution being that the priesthood was originally open to any tribe, but gradually became seen as a distinct tribe to themselves. The Priestly source and the Blessing of Moses, which critical scholars view as originating centuries later, portray the Levites firmly established as a tribe, and as the only tribe with the right to become priests.

Based on the controversial Shapira Scroll, Biblical scholar Idan Dershowitz has also suggested that the Levites were originally members of a profession or guild, rather than a tribe.

See also
 House of Lévis
 Tribe of Joseph

References

 
 
Levi